The Bonny Bunch of Roses is the twelfth studio album by Fairport Convention.

This album had the highest number of traditional songs that Fairport had recorded since Liege & Lief. For this album, Simon Nicol returned after an absence of five years although he had contributed some guitar to the previous record, Gottle O'Geer and mixed the album. It was recorded between August 1976 and March 1977 at Island Studios, London.

Track listing 
All tracks credited to "Trad." unless otherwise noted

Side one
 "Jams O'Donnells Jig" (Dave Pegg) - 2:33
 "The Eynsham Poacher"  - 2:22
 "Adieu Adieu" - 2:26
 "The Bonny Bunch of Roses" - 12:19

Side two
 "The Poor Ditching Boy" (Richard Thompson) - 3:56
 "General Taylor" - 3:39
 "Run Johnny Run" (Ralph McTell) - 4:34
 "The Last Waltz" (Dave Swarbrick) - 3:02
 "Royal Seleccion No 13" (Haste to the Wedding/Morpeth Rant/Toytown March/Dashing White Sargeant) - 4:15

Personnel 
Fairport Convention
 Dave Swarbrick - fiddle, mandolin, mandocello, vocals
 Simon Nicol - electric and acoustic guitars, vocals, dulcimer, piano
 Dave Pegg - bass guitar, guitar, mandolin, vocals
 Bruce Rowland - drums, percussion, electric piano

References and notes 

1977 albums
Fairport Convention albums